Košare can refer to the following places:

 Košare, Montenegro, a village in the municipality of Pljevlja
 Košare, Bosnia and Herzegovina, a village in the municipality of Ilijaš
 Košare, Gjakova, a village in the municipality of Gjakova/Đakovica, Kosovo
 Battle of Košare, fought in Košare, Gjakova in 1999
 Košare, Ferizaj, a village in the municipality of Ferizaj/Uroševac, Kosovo